Kolluru Chidambara Rao (10 October 1945 – 19 October 2015), known professionally as Kallu Chidambaram, was an Indian actor known for his works in Telugu cinema. Chidambaram is one of the finest comedians of Telugu cinema. Chidambaram started his career as a theatre artist while working as an Assistant Engineer in Visakhapatnam Port Trust. He made his film debut in 1988 with Kallu from which acquired his stage name. He had garnered the state Nandi Special Jury Award for the film.

Early life
Chidambaram was born in Vizianagaram of Andhra Pradesh, India. He was married and has two sons and two daughters.

Career
While working full-time as an Engineer in Visakhapatnam Port Trust, he has acted in a variety of roles in the films of directors such as E. V. V. Satyanarayana, M. V. Raghu , S.V.Krishna Reddy, and Relangi Narasimha Rao, had given him exclusively comic roles in their films. In 1995, the Telugu socio-fantasy film Ammoru, directed by Kodi Ramakrishna, brought Kallu Chidambaram critical acclaim for his performance.

Filmography

References

1948 births
2015 deaths
Telugu male actors
Telugu comedians
Indian male comedians
Andhra University alumni
Indian male film actors
Indian male stage actors
Male actors from Andhra Pradesh
Male actors in Telugu cinema
Engineers from Andhra Pradesh
Nandi Award winners
20th-century Indian male actors
21st-century Indian male actors
Male actors in Telugu theatre